Daguessa Airport  is a public use airport located near Daguessa, Sila, Chad.

See also
List of airports in Chad

References

External links 
 Airport record for Daguessa Airport at Landings.com

Airports in Chad
Sila Region